Vesa Välimäki (born 1968) is a Finnish acoustics researcher and a professor at Aalto University 2002–.  He was appointed a docent in audio signal processing at Helsinki University of Technology in 1999–2002 and a full professor in 2002.

Awards and honors 
 a Fellow of the Institute of Electrical and Electronics Engineers (IEEE Signal Processing Society) (2014) 
 a Fellow of the Audio Engineering Society (2012) 
 a Life Member of the Acoustical Society of Finland (2014)

Education 
Välimäki studied at the Helsinki University of Technology, where he obtained a Master of Science in Technology in 1992, a Licentiate of Science in Technology in 1994, and a Doctor of Science in Technology in 1995.

Thesis publications

References

External links 
 
 
 
 
 

Finnish inventors
Fellow Members of the IEEE
Academic staff of Aalto University
Speech processing researchers
1968 births
Living people
People from Jämsä